The 2013 Kane County Dawgs season was a short-lived season for the  Continental Indoor Football League (CIFL) franchise.

The franchise was originally to be called the DeKalb Dawgs, and were to play in the American Professional Football League in 2013, before announcing that they would be joining the Continental Indoor Football League as its tenth member in October 2012. On October 10, 2012, the franchise announced that former National Football League and Arena Football League player Matt Griebel was named the team's first head coach. The team also announced that they would be playing their home games at the Seven Bridges Ice Arena in Woodridge, Illinois.

After having the first two weeks of the season off with a bye weeks, the Dawgs forfeit their first game, when the turf they purchased did not adequately fit the Seven Bridges Ice Arena. The following week, the Dawgs would lose their first ever played game in franchise history, with a 13-69 loss to the Erie Explosion.

The loss to the Explosion, would end up being the team's only game, as the following week the league announced on their website that the Dawgs franchise was "indefinitely suspending operations" to protect the integrity of the league. Players and coaches were all released and free to sign with other teams in the CIFL or elsewhere.

Roster

Schedule

Regular season

Standings

Coaching staff

References

2013 Continental Indoor Football League season
Kane County Dawgs